The title of Supreme Head of the Church of England was created in 1531 for King Henry VIII when he first began to separate the Church of England from the authority of the Holy See and allegiance to the papacy, then represented by Pope Clement VII. The Act of Supremacy of 1534 confirmed the King's status as having supremacy over the church and required the nobility to swear an oath recognising Henry's supremacy. By 1536, Henry had broken with Rome, seized assets of the Catholic Church in England and Wales and declared the Church of England as the established church with himself as its head. Pope Paul III excommunicated Henry in 1538 over his divorce from Catherine of Aragon.

Henry's daughter, Queen Mary I, a staunch Catholic, attempted to restore the English church's allegiance to the Pope and repealed the Act of Supremacy in 1555. Her half-sister, Elizabeth I, took the throne in 1558 and Parliament passed the Act of Supremacy of 1558 that restored the original act. The new Oath of Supremacy that nobles were required to swear gave the Queen's title as supreme governor of the church rather than supreme head, to avoid the charge that the monarchy was claiming divinity or usurping Christ, whom the Bible explicitly identifies as Head of the Church.

List of supreme heads

References

Anglicanism
History of the Church of England
English monarchy
Church of England lists
16th century in England
16th-century Christianity
16th century in law
1536 establishments in England